Solar Bird is a 1966 sculpture by Spanish artist Joan Miró. Several institutions have copies in their collections, including:

 Art Institute of Chicago (1966, bronze, 48 x 71 x 40 in.)
 Museum of Modern Art (1966, bronze, 47 1/4 x 70 7/8 x 40 1/8")
 San Diego Museum of Art (1966–1967, bronze), Balboa Park
 Fundació Joan Miró, Barcelona (Carrara marble, 163 x 146 x 240 cm, 1968)
 Fondation Maeght, Saint-Paul-de-Vence (Carrara marble, 1968)

See also

 1966 in art

References

1966 sculptures
Abstract sculptures in California
Abstract sculptures in New York City
Sculptures of the Art Institute of Chicago
Sculptures of birds
Bronze sculptures in California
Bronze sculptures in Illinois
Bronze sculptures in New York City
Marble sculptures in Spain
Modernist sculpture
Outdoor sculptures in San Diego
Sculptures of the San Diego Museum of Art
Sculptures by Joan Miró
Sculptures of the Museum of Modern Art (New York City)